The Golden Globe Award for Best Foreign Language Film is a Golden Globe Award presented by the Hollywood Foreign Press Association.

Until 1986, it was known as the Golden Globe Award for Best Foreign Film, meaning that any non-American film could be honoured. In 1987, it was changed to Best Foreign Language Film, so that non-American English-language films are now considered for the Best Motion Picture awards. Additionally, this change makes American films primarily in another language eligible for this award, including winners like Letters from Iwo Jima and Minari as well as nominees such as Apocalypto, The Kite Runner, and In the Land of Blood and Honey.

Note that since the 1987 change in the criteria for this award, its eligibility criteria have been considerably broader than those for the Academy Award for Best International Feature Film (known before 2020 as Academy Award for Best Foreign Language Film). American films have never been eligible for this award, and even non-U.S. films had to have principal dialogue in a native (non-English) language of the submitting country until 2006.

Before 1974, the award was given only infrequently, and with several films being jointly honoured per year.

The most honored country in this category is the United Kingdom, with seven films honored. The most honoured countries after 1987 are Spain and France.

Eligibility criteria
Like the Academy Award for Best International Feature Film, this award does not require that an eligible film be released in the United States. The official rules for the award state that submitted films must be at least 70 minutes in length and have at least 51% of their dialogue in a language other than English, and that they be "first released in their country of origin during the 14-months period from November 1 to December 31, prior to the Awards". Films that were not released in their country of origin due to censorship qualify with a one-week release in the U.S. during the specified period.

The Hollywood Foreign Press Association (HFPA), presenter of the Golden Globes, also does not limit the number of submitted films from a given country. This differs from the practice of the Academy Awards' presenter, the Academy of Motion Picture Arts and Sciences (AMPAS), which limits each country to one submission per year.

The two presenting organizations also differ slightly in their eligibility practices with respect to other awards. All foreign-language films, even those not submitted or not eligible for the Best International Feature Film Oscar, are eligible for all other Academy Awards as long as they are released in Los Angeles County, California during the award year. The HFPA, however, specifically makes foreign-language films ineligible for its two Best Picture Awards for live-action films (Best Drama and Best Musical or Comedy).

Best Foreign-Language Foreign Film
1949: Bicycle Thieves (Ladri di biciclette) (Italy)
1954: Twenty-Four Eyes (Nijushi no hitomi) (Japan); No Way Back (Weg Ohne Umkehr) (West Germany); The Lady of the Camelias (Argentina); Genevieve (United Kingdom)
1955: Ordet (The Word); (Denmark); Stella (Greece); Children, Mother, and the General (Kinder, Mutter und Ein General) (West Germany); Eyes of Children (Japan); Curvas peligrosas (Dangerous Curves) (Mexico);
1956: Before Sundown (Vor Sonnenuntergang) (West Germany); The Girl in Black (To Koritsi me ta mavra) (Greece); Roses on the Arm (Taiyo to bara) (Japan); War and Peace (Italy); The White Reindeer (Valkoinen Peura) (Finland)
1957: Confessions of Felix Krull (Bekenntnisse des Hochstaplers Felix Krull) (West Germany); Tizoc (Mexico); Yellow Crow (Kiiroi karasu) (Japan)
1958: Girl and the River (L'Eau vive) (France); The Road a Year Long (Cesta duga godinu dana) (Yugoslavia); Rosemary (Das Mädchen Rosemarie) (West Germany)
1959: Die Brücke (The Bridge) (West Germany); Black Orpheus (Orfeu Negro) (Brazil/France); Odd Obsession (Kagi) (Japan); Wild Strawberries (Smultronstället) (Sweden); Wir Wunderkinder (Aren't We Wonderful?) (West Germany)
1960: The Virgin Spring (Jungfrukällan) (Sweden); The Truth (La Vérité) (France)
1961: Two Women (La ciociara) (Italy)
1962: Divorce Italian Style (Divorzio all'italiana) (Italy)
1963: Any Number Can Win (Mélodie en sous-sol) (France)
1964: Marriage Italian Style (Matrimonio all'italiana) (Italy) and Sallah Shabati (Israel)

Notes:
 The winner in each year is shown with a blue background.

Best Foreign Film – English Language

Awards for Foreign Language Films
1965-1972: Best Foreign Film – Foreign Language
1973-1985: Best Foreign Film
1986–present: Best Foreign Language Film

1960s

1970s

1980s

1990s

2000s

2010s

2020s

Multiple winners 
Nine directors have won the award multiple times.

See also
 BAFTA Award for Best Film Not in the English Language
 Critics' Choice Movie Award for Best Foreign Language Film
 Academy Award for Best International Feature Film (List of Academy Award winners and nominees for Best International Feature Film)
 Saturn Award for Best International Film

References

Foreign Language Film
 
Film awards for Best Foreign Language Film
History of immigration to the United States